Mbozi is an ungrouped iron meteorite found in Tanzania. It is one of the world's largest meteorites, variously estimated as the fourth-largest to the eighth-largest, it is located near the city of Mbeya in Tanzania's southern highlands.

Discovery and naming
Mbozi has been long known to locals, who call it kimondo, yet became known to outsiders only in the 1930s. It is named after Mbozi District, in Mbeya (Tanzania). When it was discovered by scientists in 1930 it didn't have a crater.

Mineralogy
Mbozi consists of meteoric iron with small silicate inclusions. The meteoric iron has a nickel concentration of 8% and shows Widmanstätten pattern.  The Germanium-Gallium ratio is larger than 10, which can also be seen in meteorites of the IIF iron meteorite group and the Eagle station pallasites.

The silicate inclusions have a core and mantle structure in thin section. The mantle is made from glass, that partially devitrified into pyroxene and plagioclase. The core consists of quartz.

Classification
Currently classified as an ungrouped iron meteorite Mbozi shows similarities with IIF iron meteorites, the Eagle station pallasites and a few other ungrouped iron meteorite (e.g. Bocaiuva meteorite).

See also 
 Glossary of meteoritics

External links

 Largest meteorites
 Images

References 

Meteorites found in Tanzania